Pleito may refer to:
Pleyto, California
Pleito Hills, in California